"Ooops Up" is a song by German Eurodance group Snap!, released in June 1990 as the second single from their debut studio album, World Power (1990). The song is a re-working of "I Don't Believe You Want to Get Up and Dance (Ooops!)"; a 1980 hit by The Gap Band, with which band member Penny Ford was a former backing singer. The single was a world-wide hit and reached number-one in Greece. Lyrically the song is about Murphy's Law. The narrator talks about it and everything that went wrong during his day. Its music video was directed by Liam Kan.

Chart performance
Like its predecessor, "Ooops Up" was very successful on the charts on several continents, peaking at number-one in Greece. And it reached the number two position in Austria, the Netherlands, Norway, Sweden, Switzerland and West Germany. It entered the top 10 also in Belgium (4), Denmark (10), Finland (4), Italy (3), Spain (6) and the UK. In the latter, the single peaked at number five in its third week on the UK Singles Chart, on June 24, 1990. It stayed at that position for two weeks. Outside Europe, "Ooops Up" reached number-one on the RPM Dance/Urban chart in Canada, number four in Australia, number five in Zimbabwe, number eight in New Zealand and number 35 on the Billboard Hot 100 in the US. On the Billboard Dance/Club Play Songs chart, it peaked at number four. 

The song was awarded with a gold record in Australia (35,000), Austria (25,000), Sweden (25,000) and the US (500,000), and a silver record in the United Kingdom (200,000).

Critical reception
AllMusic editor Andrew Hamilton noted that the song is a "remake/takeoff" of the Gap Band's nonsensical funk riff "Oops Upside Your Head". Bill Coleman from Billboard commented, "Sizzling hip-hop jam should help act maintain "the power" over club and radio jocks." Dave Sholin from the Gavin Report wrote that "reaching into The Gap Band songbook, this powerhouse outfit comes up with the perfect remake, giving it a glowing nineties treatment." Push from Melody Maker remarked that the song "was an attempt at something a little different" than sticking around with the same formula as "The Power". Another editor, Andrew Smith, called it "juddery funk".	

David Giles from Music Week felt it has "a shuffling rhythm distinctive enough to earn them another big success." Gene Sandbloom from The Network Forty described it as a "powerful bass busting track combining rap and song. Already one of the most danced to songs in the country." A reviewer from Newcastle Evening Chronicle named "Ooops Up" one of the best songs of the World Power album. Tom Doyle from Smash Hits declared it as "one of the best attempts" in matching the brilliance of their debut, "The Power". He called it "a sort of cover of the Gap Band's "Ooops Upside Your Head" mixed with a dodgy reinterpretation of "Little Miss Muffet"."

Music video
The accompanying music video for "Ooops Up" was directed by Liam Kan and is in both black-and-white and colours. He would also direct the video for the group's next song, "Cult of Snap".

Track listings

 12-inch maxi
 "Ooops Up" (Vocal) – 6:17	
 "Ooops Up" (Other Mix) – 6:40	
 "Ooops Up" (Instrumental) – 5:33

 7-inch single
 "Ooops Up" (Vocal Edit) – 3:57	
 "Ooops Up" (Instrumental Edit) – 3:57

 CD single
 "Ooops Up" (Edit) – 3:59
 "Ooops Up" (Vocal Version) – 	6:17
 "Ooops Up" (Other Mix) – 6:40

 CD maxi version
 "Ooops Up" (Vocal Edit) – 3:57	
 "Ooops Up" (Vocal 12" Mix) – 6:17	
 "Ooops Up" (Other Mix) – 6:40	

 2003 version (Snap feat. NG3)
 "Ooops Up!" (Radio Edit) – 3:20
 "Ooops Up!" (Extended Club Mix) – 4:03
 "Ooops Up!" (Oops Up 90) – 4:00

Charts and certifications

Weekly charts

Original version

"Ooops Up 2003"

Year-end charts

Original version

Certifications

References

1990 singles
1990 songs
Electro songs
English-language German songs
Music videos directed by Liam Kan
Number-one singles in Greece
Snap! songs
Songs written by Charlie Wilson (singer)
Songs written by Lonnie Simmons
Songs written by Rudy Taylor